Berkelium(III) nitrate is the berkelium salt of nitric acid with the formula Bk(NO3)3. It commonly forms the tetrahydrate, Bk(NO3)3·4H2O, which is a light green solid. If heated to 450 °C, it decomposes to berkelium(IV) oxide and 22 milligrams of the solution of this compound is reported to cost one million dollars.

Production and uses
Berkelium(III) nitrate is produced by the reaction of berkelium metal, the hydroxide, or chloride with nitric acid. This compound has no commercial uses, but was used to synthesize the element tennessine. The aqueous compound was painted onto a titanium foil and was bombarded with calcium-48 atoms to synthesize the element tennessine.

This compound is used as a pathway to pentavalent berkelium compounds by the collision-induced dissociation of this compound do produce BkO2(NO3)2– which contains berkelium in the +5 oxidation state.

References

Berkelium compounds
nitrates